Article 23 may refer to:

In law:
Hong Kong Basic Law Article 23, which requires Hong Kong to pass security legislation concerning sedition against the Chinese government
Section Twenty-three of the Canadian Charter of Rights and Freedoms, which guarantee minority language educational rights to French-speaking communities outside Quebec
Article 23 in Chapter V of the United Nations Charter, which establishes the composition of the Security Council
Article 23 of the Constitution of the Netherlands, regarding freedom of education

In fiction:
Article 23 (novel), a 1998 novel by William R. Forstchen